Beyond Blood is a 2016 Nigerian romantic drama film directed by Greg Odutayo, and starring Kehinde Bankole, Joseph Benjamin, Bimbo Manuel, Deyemi Okanlawon, Carol King, Wole Ojo and Shan George. It premiered on 14 January 2016 in Lagos, and was generally released on 15 January 2016.

Cast
Kehinde Bankole as
Joseph Benjamin as
Bimbo Manuel as
Deyemi Okanlawon as
Carol King as
Wole Ojo as
Shan George as

References

2010s English-language films